Torre Reforma Latino is a skyscraper on Paseo de la Reforma #296 in the Zona Rosa section of Colonia Juárez, Mexico City, one of the top 20 tallest in the country. The 46-story building was completed in 2016, construction having begun in 2012. Some of its tenants include WeWork, Linio and the national offices for UN-Habitat Mexico. It is located on the site of what was one of Mexico's largest and most famous cinemas, the Cine Latino.

See also
Skyscraper design and construction
List of tallest buildings in Mexico

References

Buildings and structures in Mexico City
Residential buildings completed in 2016
Paseo de la Reforma